The Cook County, Illinois, general election was held on November 7, 2002.

Primaries were held March 21, 2000.

Elections were held for Clerk of the Circuit Court, Recorder of Deeds, State's Attorney, four seats on the Water Reclamation District Board, and judgeships on the Circuit Court of Cook County.

Election information
2000 was a presidential election year in the United States. The primaries and general elections for Cook County races coincided with those for federal races (President and House) and those for state elections.

Voter turnout

Primary election
Voter turnout in Cook County during the primaries was 28.26%. The city of Chicago saw 32.82% turnout and suburban Cook County saw 23.13% turnout.

General election
The general election saw 71.50% turnout, with 1,988,821 ballots cast. Chicago saw 70.22% turnout and suburban Cook County saw 72.94% turnout.

Clerk of the Circuit Court 

In the 2000 Clerk of the Circuit Court of Cook County election,  incumbent third-term clerk Aurelia Pucinski, a Republican who had been elected as a Democrat (switching parties in 1998), did not seek reelection. Democrat Dorothy A. Brown was elected to succeed her.

Brown's election made her the first African-American to serve as clerk of the circuit court of Cook County.

Primaries

Democratic
Candidates
The following candidates ran for the Democratic Party nomination for Clerk of the Circuit Court:

Results

Republican
Candidate
The following candidate ran for the Democratic Party nomination for Clerk of the Circuit Court:

Nancy Mynard, information technology company executive
Results

General election

Recorder of Deeds 

In the 2000 Cook County Recorder of Deeds election, incumbent Recorder of Deeds Eugene Moore, a Democrat, was elected to his first full term. Moore had first been appointed in 1999 (after Jesse White resigned to become Illinois Secretary of State).

Primaries

Democratic
Candidate
The following candidate ran for the Democratic Party nomination for Clerk of the Circuit Court:
Eugene "Gene" Moore, incumbent

Results

Republican
Candidate
The following candidate ran for the Democratic Party nomination for Clerk of the Circuit Court:
Arthur D. Sutton

Results

General election

State's Attorney 

In the 2000 Cook County State's Attorney election, incumbent first-term State's Attorney Richard A. Devine, a Democrat, was reelected.

Primaries

Democratic
Candidate
The following candidate ran for the Democratic Party nomination for Clerk of the Circuit Court:
Richard A. Devine, incumbent

Republican
Candidate
The following candidate ran for the Democratic Party nomination for Clerk of the Circuit Court:
David P. Gaughan, former Assistant Cook County State's Attorney (1989–1999)

General election

Water Reclamation District Board 

In the 2000 Metropolitan Water Reclamation District of Greater Chicago election, four of the nine seats on the Metropolitan Water Reclamation District of Greater Chicago board were up for election. Three were up in a regularly-scheduled at-large election, while a fourth seat was up in for a separate special election.

Judicial elections 
Pasrtisan elections were held for judgeships on the Circuit Court of Cook County due to vacancies. Retention elections were also held for the Circuit Court.

Partisan elections were also held for subcircuit courts judgeships due to vacancies. Retention elections were held for other judgeships.

Ballot questions 
One ballot questions was included on ballots county-wide during the March primary.

Tobacco Settlement
A ballot question involving tobacco settlement funds was included on the March primary ballot.

Other elections
Coinciding with the primaries, elections were held to elect both the Democratic and Republican committeemen for the wards of Chicago.

See also 
 2000 Illinois elections

References 

Cook County
Cook County, Illinois elections
Cook County 2000
Cook County